Plains railway station served the village of Plains, North Lanarkshire, Scotland from 1882 to 1951 on the Bathgate and Coatbridge Railway.

History 
The station opened in May 1882 by the North British Railway. To the west was Brownieside Colliery and to the east of the level crossing was the signal box. The station closed on 18 June 1951.

References

External links 

Disused railway stations in North Lanarkshire
Former North British Railway stations
Railway stations in Great Britain opened in 1882
Railway stations in Great Britain closed in 1951
1882 establishments in Scotland
1951 disestablishments in Scotland